Modern Ruin may refer to:

 Modern ruins, a neologism referring to ruins of architecture constructed in the recent past
 Modern Ruin (Covenant album), a 2011 album
 Modern Ruin (Frank Carter & the Rattlesnakes album), a 2017 album